Sharper is a 2023 American psychological thriller film directed by Benjamin Caron and written by Brian Gatewood and Alessandro Tanaka. The film stars Julianne Moore (who also served as a producer), Sebastian Stan, Justice Smith, Briana Middleton, and John Lithgow.

Sharper was released in select theaters in the United States on February 10, 2023, by A24, before its Apple TV+ release on February 17, 2023.

Plot

Tom
Tom is the owner of a used bookstore in New York City. One day, a woman named Sandra comes in looking for a book, and after initially declining his advances, the two begin a romance. Weeks into their relationship, Sandra tells Tom that her brother is in debt and must pay $350,000 or be killed. Tom reveals that his father is wealthy, and offers to cover the debt. After providing the money to Sandra, she disappears, pushing Tom into a nervous breakdown.

"Sandra"
"Sandra" is revealed to be Sandy, a parolee with a long criminal history. One night, before her relationship with Tom, she is meeting with her parole officer, who attempts to shake her down for money. She is paid off by an apparently wealthy man, Max, who is actually a con artist. He takes Sandy on as a partner, and trains her to pull cons. After taking down their first mark together, the two have sex.

Max
Before his partnership with Sandy, Max visits his mother, Madeline, and her new boyfriend, billionaire Richard Hobbes, at Richard's lavish apartment. Max, who appears drunk and belligerent, convinces Madeline to allow him to stay at Richard's apartment. The next day, Madeline and Richard come home to Max apparently being arrested for soliciting drugs from an undercover police officer. Madeline quickly realizes that Max is pulling a con to have Richard pay off the officer, Max's partner Tipsy. Madeline forces Max to leave the apartment, but it is later revealed that Madeline and Max are lovers, not mother and son, and are targeting Richard.

Richard meets with Max, who demands a year's salary in cash in order to leave Madeline alone to be with Richard. While meeting with him, Max also meets Richard's son—Tom, who has not yet met Sandy. Max, Madeline, and Tipsy celebrate a successful job, but that evening, Madeline tells Max that Richard wants to marry her, and she will be staying with him. Max escapes from the police Madeline has called and leaves with the money.

Madeline
Richard dies, leaving the vast majority of his estate to Madeline. Due to Richard's misgivings about Tom after the incident with Sandy, Tom has been left only the bookstore. He has also been named chairman of Richard's foundation, while Madeline is a trustee.

Tom hires an old family friend, Braddock, to locate "Sandra". Despite Madeline's attempts to convince Tom to call off the investigation, Sandy is found, heavily addicted to heroin. Tom wants her to stay at the apartment while she goes through detox, but Madeline is reticent. She speaks to Sandy, who reveals that she knows the connection between Madeline and Max. In return for her silence, Sandy demands that Madeline track down Max so she can confront him about abandoning her.

Max agrees to meet with Sandy and Madeline. During the meeting, Tom and Braddock arrive to confirm Tom's suspicions that the three had been working together. Tom pulls a gun on Sandy, then on Madeline. Sandy forces the gun out of Tom's hands, and it is picked up by Madeline, who apparently shoots and kills Tom after he forces her to point the gun at him and pull the trigger. Desperate to avoid prison, Madeline immediately transfers all the money to Richard's foundation.

Madeline, Max, and Sandy are put on a plane to Oklahoma City. Madeline reminds Max that she will retain control of the money, since Tom is dead and she is the trustee of Richard's foundation. After a distraught Sandy retreats to the bathroom, Madeline realizes that the blood on her sleeve is not real, meaning Tom is alive. When Madeline checks the bathroom, Sandy is gone.

Sandy
The true nature of the scheme is revealed; having fallen in love with Tom, Sandy confesses her true identity to him, and the two devise a plan to con Madeline and Max, enlisting Tipsy and his partner Goldie—who posed as "Braddock"—to assist them. The meeting between Sandy and Max was planned, as was Tom's apparent shooting at Madeline's hands. Since Tom is still alive, he maintains control over the foundation and the money. Tom, Sandy, Tipsy, and Goldie meet at the bookstore to celebrate their success. Tom and Sandy begin to rekindle their relationship.

Cast

Production
In March 2021, it was announced that A24 would produce the film for Apple TV+, directed by Benjamin Caron and starring Julianne Moore, based on a script written by Brian Gatewood and Alessandro Tanaka that was part of the 2020 The Black List of screenplays that will not be released in theaters during this calendar year. In July 2021, Sebastian Stan was added to the cast, with Justice Smith and Briana Middleton joining in August. In September, John Lithgow was cast, with filming beginning on September 13 in New York City.

Release
Sharper was released in select theaters in the United States on February 10, 2023, by A24, and was released on Apple TV+ on February 17, 2023.

Reception
 On Metacritic, the film has a score of 65 out of 100 based on 35 critics, indicating "generally favorable reviews".

References

External links
 
 

2023 directorial debut films
2023 thriller films
2020s psychological thriller films
A24 (company) films
American nonlinear narrative films
American psychological thriller films
Apple TV+ original films
Films about con artists
Films scored by Clint Mansell
Films set in New York City
Films shot in New York City